Martín Esteban Michel (born 4 October 1983) is an Argentine professional footballer who plays as a forward for Santamarina.

Career
Grupo Universitario were Michel's first team. After playing for them in the 2001–02 Torneo Argentino B, he had stints with Ateneo Estrada, Atlético Ayacucho and Ferroviario de Coronel Dorrego. Michel rejoined Grupo Universitario in 2004, remaining for a total of four years. Ahead of the 2008–09 Primera B Nacional campaign, Michel joined Quilmes. His professional debut came on 16 August 2008 against San Martín. Michel played just twice for Quilmes, departing in 2009 for a third spell back with Grupo Universitario. In total, he scored thirty-three times in one hundred and nine appearances for them.

On 31 July 2010, Michel completed a move to Bolivian Primera División side Universitario de Sucre. He scored against Guabirá, Nacional Potosí and La Paz across the 2010 and 2011 campaigns in Bolivia. 2011 saw Michel return to his homeland with Santamarina. Nineteen goals followed across sixty-one appearances in Torneo Argentino A, some of which came in 2013–14 which Santamarina ended as champions. He spent two more years there, prior to spending a season with Gimnasia y Esgrima in 2016. Having scored one in fourteen games, Michel sealed a return to Santamarina on 30 June 2016.

Career statistics
.

Honours
Santamarina
Torneo Argentino A: 2013–14

References

External links

1983 births
Living people
People from Tandil
Argentine footballers
Association football forwards
Argentine expatriate footballers
Expatriate footballers in Bolivia
Argentine expatriate sportspeople in Bolivia
Torneo Argentino B players
Primera Nacional players
Bolivian Primera División players
Torneo Argentino A players
Grupo Universitario de Tandil players
Quilmes Atlético Club footballers
Universitario de Sucre footballers
Club y Biblioteca Ramón Santamarina footballers
Gimnasia y Esgrima de Jujuy footballers
Sportspeople from Buenos Aires Province